Goodenia elderi  is a species of flowering plant in the family Goodeniaceae and is endemic to inland areas of Western Australia. It is an erect or virgate shrub with linear, more or less bunched stem leaves, and spreading racemes of white or yellow flowers.

Description

Taxonomy and naming
Goodenia elderi was first formally described in 1874 by Ferdinand von Mueller and Ralph Tate in the journal Botanisches Centralblatt from material collected "on sandy places near Warangering" during an expedition funder by Thomas Elder. The specific epithet (elderi) honours Thomas Elder.

Distribution and habitat
This goodenia grows in sandy soil between Karalee west of Coolgardie and Queen Victoria Spring north of Zanthus in the Coolgardie, Great Victoria Desert, Murchison, Nullarbor and Yalgoo biogeographic regions of inland Western Australia.

Conservation status
Goodenia elderi is classified as "not threatened" by the Government of Western Australia Department of Parks and Wildlife.

References

elderi
Eudicots of Western Australia
Plants described in 1874
Taxa named by Ferdinand von Mueller
Taxa named by Ralph Tate
Endemic flora of Western Australia